Callie Rennison is an American criminologist whose research interest is violent victimization. She is a professor and former associate dean of faculty affairs at University of Colorado Denver School of Public Affairs.

Education 
Rennison earned her PhD in 1997 in Political Science from the University of Houston, University Park. She also holds a BS in Psychology, MA in Sociology, and MA in Political science from the University of Houston.

Career 
Callie Rennison is the Director of Equity, and Title IX Coordinator at the University of Colorado Denver | Anschutz Medical Campus. In addition, she is a full professor, and former Associate Dean of Faculty Affairs in the School of Public Affairs, University of Colorado Denver. She was previously Assistant Professor, Department of Criminology and Criminal Justice, University of Missouri - Saint Louis (UMSL).

She studies violence against women.

Regent of the University of Colorado
In the 2020 general election, Rennison was elected to represent the 2nd district of the University of Colorado Board of Regents. A Democrat, Rennison defeated her Republican and Libertarian opponents, winning 60% of the vote. Her six-year term expires in 2027.

Select publications

References

External links 
 Author Interview with Dr. Callie Rennison
 Criminologist, Callie Rennison gets personal with insights on life in academia
 Board of Regents profile

Living people
Criminologists
Women in Colorado politics
Colorado Democrats
University of Colorado Denver faculty
People from Boulder County, Colorado
21st-century American politicians
21st-century American women politicians